Garnham Edmonds JP (20 April 1865 – 9 April 1946) was a British butcher and Liberal politician who was both an MP and Mayor of Bethnal Green.

Background
Edmonds was described as tall, handsome, with a great shock of hair. He had a daughter, Kate E. Rawles, who was awarded the MBE.

Professional career
Edmonds was a butcher in Bethnal Green, East London, trading as Edmonds and Mears tripe dressers.
His butchers shop was located in Bethnal Green Road and sold tripe and offal. After his election to parliament he continued to serve behind the counter and would travel each morning at 6.30am to Smithfield Market to make purchases. He was also a religious and social worker.

Political career
Edmonds was President of the local Liberal association. In 1902 he was elected a member of Bethnal Green Metropolitan Borough Council, and was mayor of the borough from 1907–08. In 1910 he was elected as a Progressive Party member of the London County Council, holding his seat until retiring in 1922. In the general election of that year he was elected as Member of Parliament for Bethnal Green North East with a majority of 115 votes over Walter Windsor of the Labour Party. However, a further election was held in 1923, and Edmonds was unseated by Windsor. He again contested the seat in 1924 but lost by 95 votes. He continued as prospective Liberal candidate until resigning in 1926. He did not stand for parliament again. He did return to local politics, being elected again to Bethnal Green Council, serving as Chairman of the Baths Committee. He served as a Justice of the peace for the County of London.

Electoral record

Death
Edmonds died at his home in Woodford Green, Essex, in April 1946, aged 81.

References

External links 
 

1865 births
1946 deaths
Liberal Party (UK) MPs for English constituencies
UK MPs 1922–1923
Members of London County Council
Progressive Party (London) politicians
Members of Bethnal Green Metropolitan Borough Council